Botryotrichum is a genus of soil and indoor fungus first described in 1885.

Species 
The following species are currently accepted in the genus Botryotrichum:

 Botryotrichum atrogriseum
 Botryotrichum cyaneum
 Botryotrichum domesticum
 Botryotrichum foricae
 Botryotrichum gorakhpurensis
 Botryotrichum indicum
 Botryotrichum keratinophilum
 Botryotrichum lachnella
 Botryotrichum murorum
 Botryotrichum nematophagus
 Botryotrichum pampeanum
 Botryotrichum peruvianum
 Botryotrichum piluliferum
 Botryotrichum spirotrichum
 Botryotrichum verrucosum
 Botryotrichum villosum

References 

Sordariales